Brissago-Valtravaglia is a comune (municipality) in the Province of Varese in the Italian region Lombardy, located about  northwest of Milan and about  northwest of Varese.

References

Cities and towns in Lombardy